Ernie Ahoff (died November 23, 1985) was a Canadian football guard and tackle who played for the Winnipeg Blue Bombers of the Canadian Football League. He played in 36 games for the Blue Bombers from 1946–49.

References 

1920s births
1985 deaths
Canadian football guards
Canadian football tackles
Winnipeg Blue Bombers players